Gerald Linford Beckley (born September 12, 1952), better known as Gerry Beckley, is an American singer, songwriter, and musician, and a founding member of the band America.

Early life
Beckley was born to an American father and an English mother.  He began playing the piano at the age of three and the guitar a few years later. By 1962, Beckley was playing guitar in The Vanguards, an instrumental surf music band in Virginia. He spent every summer in England and soon discovered British invasion music.

Career
In 1967, Beckley's father became the commander at the United States Air Force base at RAF West Ruislip, near London. Gerry attended London Central High School in Bushey Hall in north west London, where he played in various school bands and met his soon-to-be bandmates, Dewey Bunnell and Dan Peek. Originally, the group played on Friday nights at the local American teen club, mostly doing acoustic covers of Crosby, Stills, and Nash tunes. The original drummer was a classmate, Dave Atwood.

America signed a recording contract with the British division of Warner Bros. Records and found success in 1972 with "A Horse with No Name."

Beckley wrote and sang America's 1972 top-10 hit "I Need You" and its 1975 number-one hit "Sister Golden Hair", as well as its top-20 followup "Daisy Jane".  He also sang their '80s top-10 hit "You Can Do Magic".

Beckley continues to write and record music both as a solo artist and with other musicians. With Bunnell, Beckley continues touring worldwide as "America".

Solo projects
In the 1990 John Waters film Cry-Baby, Beckley, Andrew Gold, and Timothy B. Schmit appeared as Baldwin and the Whiffles, performing "Mister Sandman", "The Naughty Lady of Shady Lane", and "Sh-Boom".

Beckley has worked with a wide variety of musicians on many projects. In the mid-1970s, he collaborated with David Cassidy on Cassidy's critically acclaimed RCA albums, co-writing, singing, and co-producing. From 1992 to 1997 he collaborated with Carl Wilson of The Beach Boys, and Robert Lamm of Chicago, culminating with the 2000 release of Like a Brother, Wilson's final recordings before his death in 1998.

In May 2006, Beckley released another solo album, Horizontal Fall.

In March 2007, Beckley appeared as a guest on the Australian musical quiz TV show Spicks and Specks. In April 2007, he appeared as a special guest at a Ben Kweller show in Melbourne, Australia. Beckley, Kweller, and the band performed "Sister Golden Hair" together.

Beckley debuted his 2016 Blue Elan Records solo album Carousel on September 7, 2016, with a live performance at the Whisky a Go Go in Hollywood, California.

Beckley is also a member of Les Deux Love Orchestra.

Personal life
Beckley was married to Eleanor Beckley from 1978 to 1982 and then to Kathy Beckley. He has two sons, Matthew (Born July 16, 1983) and Joe (Born February 22, 1992). Matthew is also a musician; he has toured with Katy Perry and has worked with other artists, including Ke$ha and Britney Spears. Joe is an aspiring photographer in the Los Angeles area. Beckley, now married to an Australian, splits his time between homes in California and Australia.

Discography
See also America discography

Solo albums
 Van Go Gan (1995)
 Go Man Go (2000)
 Horizontal Fall (2006)
 Happy Hour (2009)
 Unfortunate Casino (2011)
 Carousel (2016)
 Five Mile Road (2019) (US Americana/Folk Album Sales Chart No. 23)
 Discovering America (2020) - Recorded June 1970 at Morgan Studios
 Keeping The Light On - The Best of Gerry Beckley (2021) - Compilation and new studio material
 Aurora (2022)

Collaborations
 Baldwin and the Whiffles - Cry-Baby Soundtrack (1990)
 Beckley, Lamm & Wilson - Like A Brother (2000)

Sessions (selection)
 Mike Hugg - Somewhere (1972)
 Dan Fogelberg - Souvenirs (1974)
 David Cassidy  - Home Is Where the Heart Is and Getting It in the Street (Both released in 1976)
 Ricci Martin - Beached (1977)
 Rick Danko - Rick Danko (1977)
 Dennis Wilson - Pacific Ocean Blue (1977)
 Dave Mason - Mariposa De Oro (1978)
 Jimmy Webb - Angel Heart (1982)
 Dan Peek - Doer of the Word (1984)
 Various Artists - Cry Baby – Original Soundtrack (1990)
 Modern Folk Quartet - Highway 70 (1995)
 Various Artists - For the Love of Harry – Everybody Sings Nilsson (1995)
 Robert Lamm - In My Head (1999)
 Jeff Larson - Room for the Summer (2000)
 Jeffrey Foskett - Twelve And Twelve (2000)
 Les Deux Love Orchestra - Music From Les Deux Cafés (2001)
 Jeff Larson - Fragile Sunrise (2002)
 Low - Trust (2002)
 Robert Lamm - Subtlety And Passion (2003)
 Jeff Larson - Sepia (2004)
 Low - Great Destroyer (2005)
 Les Deux Love Orchestra - King Kong (2005)
 Brian Wilson a.o. - One World Project (2005)
 Bill Mumy - With Big Ideas (2006)
 Les Deux Love Orchestra - Ecstasy (2008)
 Al Jardine - A Postcard From California (2009)
 Jeff Larson - Heart of the Valley (2009)
 Les Deux Love Orchestra - Planet Claire 3D Maxi-Single (2009)
 Nick Vernier Band - Sessions (2010)

References

External links
 Official site
 
 Sessions, etc.

Living people
1952 births
People from Fort Worth, Texas
Singer-songwriters from Texas
American rock guitarists
American people of English descent
American soft rock musicians
America (band) members
American folk guitarists
American male guitarists
American rock keyboardists
American pop rock singers
Guitarists from Texas
American expatriates in Australia
20th-century American guitarists
20th-century American pianists
American male pianists
21st-century American keyboardists
21st-century American pianists
20th-century American male musicians
21st-century American male musicians
20th-century American keyboardists
American male singer-songwriters